The Journal of Vacuum Science and Technology is a peer-reviewed scientific journal published in two parts, A and B, by the American Institute of Physics on behalf of the American Vacuum Society. It was established in 1964 and the editor-in-chief is Eray Aydil (University of Minnesota).

History
1964–1982 Journal of Vacuum Science and Technology
1983–present Journal of Vacuum Science & Technology A: Vacuum, Surfaces, and Films
1983–1990 Journal of Vacuum Science & Technology B: Microelectronics Processing and Phenomena
1991–present Journal of Vacuum Science & Technology B: Microelectronics and Nanometer Structures

Part A
Part A covers applied surface science, electronic materials and processing, fusion technology, plasma technology, surface science, thin films, vacuum metallurgy, and vacuum technology. According to the Journal Citation Reports, the journal has a 2015 impact factor of 1.724.

Part B
Part B covers vacuum and plasma processing of various materials, their structural characterization, microlithography, and the physics and chemistry of submicrometer and nanometer structures and devices. According to the Journal Citation Reports, the journal has a 2014 impact factor of 1.398.

References

External links

Physics journals
English-language journals
Publications established in 1964
Bimonthly journals
American Institute of Physics academic journals